Senator Short may refer to:

Alan Short (1920–2004), California State Senate
Linda H. Short (born 1947), South Carolina State Senate
Peyton Short (1761–1825), Kentucky State Senate
Phil Short (born 1947), Louisiana State Senate